David Carpenter (born 1930) is an American serial killer.

David Carpenter may also refer to:
David Carpenter, early Texas settler and namesake of Carpenters Bayou 
David Carpenter, better known as Dave Carpender, guitarist
David Aaron Carpenter (born 1986), violist
David Carpenter (cricketer) (born 1935), English cricketer
David Carpenter (historian) (born 1947), British historian
David Carpenter (writer) (born 1941), Canadian novelist
J. D. "David" Carpenter (born 1948), Canadian poet and novelist
Dave Carpenter (1959–2008), bassist
David G. Carpenter, U.S. Assistant Secretary of State
David Carpenter (baseball, born 1985), baseball player 
David Carpenter (baseball, born 1987), baseball player
David O. Carpenter, professor of environmental health sciences